Canadian liquor plebiscites, held in 1920 under the Canada Temperance Act and the Dominion Elections Act, were referendums on the strengthening of the Prohibition measures in effect in several provinces of Canada. Voters were asked if they supported banning of importation of liquor across provincial boundaries. The referendums were held on July 10, 1920, in New Brunswick; on October 20 in British Columbia; and on October 25 in Alberta, Manitoba, Nova Scotia, and Saskatchewan.

The Canada Temperance Act, also known as the Scott Act, allowed provincial and municipal jurisdictions to formulate their own legislation regarding alcohol consumption based upon the results of a plebiscite; the results could not be challenged for at least three years. Between 1916 and 1919, prohibition legislation passed in all the provinces. The sale of alcoholic liquors, except for medical and scientific purposes, was prohibited, with medical need being interpreted loosely with liquor sold by pharmacists. In 1920, eight of the nine provinces of Canada decided to continue prohibition after the war. The Canadian liquor plebiscite addressed this postwar prohibition.

The plebiscite was set up to pose the question of banning liquor importation to provinces where prohibition had been enforced, but liquor could be ordered and imported by mail order. Ontario also had a plebiscite on the issue under the Temperance Act a few months later in 1921.

By province 
Alberta (October 25, 1920 referendum) — The question up for vote in Alberta was "Shall the importation and bringing of alcohol beverages into the province be forbidden?" After it passed, the federal government waited until February 1921 to ban the inter-provincial trade of alcohol into Alberta and by then many had stockpiled liquor.

British Columbia (October 20, 1920 referendum) — Voters were presented with the question "Which do you prefer: 1— The present prohibition act? or 2— An act to provide for the government control and sale in sealed packages of spirituous and malted liquors?" By a majority of more than 25,000 voters in British Columbia opted for the sale of liquor under regulation by the provincial government.

Manitoba (October 25, 1920 referendum) — By a majority of more than 12,000 voters opted in favor of the Canadian Temperance Act, with the prohibition against importing liquor into Manitoba to go into effect in 60 days.  The vote also cleared the way for the Manitoba Temperance Act of 1920 to be proclaimed, limiting liquor to medical prescriptions of no more than 12 ounces, by government-approved dispensers.

New Brunswick (July 10, 1920 referendum) — The first provincial vote on whether to retain prohibition took place in New Brunswick, where voters approved the bar against importation of liquor by a majority of 20,000 votes.  In another ballot question, the ban against the sale of light wine and against beer was approved a majority of 15,000.

Nova Scotia (October 25, 1920 referendum) — Voters in Nova Scotia gave a larger endorsement to prohibition than in the prairie provinces, with 40,000 more votes for prohibiting the importation of liquor than against it.  Other than Halifax and Dartmouth, no large cities voted "wet".

Saskatchewan (October 25, 1920 referendum) — By a majority of 10,000 voters in Saskatchewan endorsed the Canadian Temperance Act barring the importation of liquor.

See also
 1898 Canadian prohibition plebiscite
1919 Quebec prohibition referendum
1921 Ontario prohibition referendum
1923 Alberta prohibition plebiscite

References

Further reading

Canadian prohibition referendums
1920 elections in Canada
1920 referendums
Prohibition referendums in Alberta
Referendums in British Columbia
Referendums in New Brunswick
Referendums in Nova Scotia
Referendums in Saskatchewan
October 1920 events
1920 in Alberta
1920 in British Columbia
1920 in Manitoba
1920 in Nova Scotia
1920 in Saskatchewan
Alcohol in Alberta
Alcohol in British Columbia
Alcohol in Manitoba
Alcohol in New Brunswick
Alcohol in Nova Scotia